Cooksville may refer to:

Places
Canada
 Cooksville (Mississauga), a neighbourhood in Mississauga, Ontario, Canada
Cooksville GO Station, a station in the GO Transit network located in the neighbourhood
Mississauga East—Cooksville, an electoral district of Mississauga which includes the neighbourhood
United States
 Cooksville, Georgia
 Cooksville, Illinois
 Cooksville, Maryland
 Cooksville, Wisconsin